Al-Rami or Rami, is a town in northern Syria, administratively part of the Idlib Governorate, located south of Idlib. According to the Syria Central Bureau of Statistics (CBS), Al-Rami had a population of 4983 in the 2004 census.

References 

Cities in Syria
Populated places in Ariha District